Understrike (1965) is a novel by John Gardner. It is the second novel in his Boysie Oakes series.

When a routine mission to the United States goes haywire, Boysie Oakes is faced with the weighty responsibility of being British Special Security's observer at the important test-firing of a new missile. 
Unwillingly, and almost by accident, finding himself tackling 'Operation Understrike'. The test-firing of TREPHOLITE - a holocaustic missile designed to be launched from the latest thing in sub-aqua craft, USS Playboy. 
As the action moves at speed from New York to San Diego, Boysie meets a colourful cast of characters including his opponent Vladimir Solev, and the gorgeous Chicory Triplehouse.

Novels by John Gardner (British writer)
1965 British novels
British spy novels
British thriller novels
Frederick Muller Ltd books